The  ArrowCopter is a series of Austrian autogyros, designed and produced by FD-Composites GmbH of Zeillern. When it was in production the ArrowCopter AC20 series was supplied as complete, factory built, ready-to-fly-aircraft.

By the summer of 2018 the company website had been removed and the company had filed for insolvency protection. In October 2019 the Sichuan Dahua General Aircraft Manufacturing Company of China purchased the assets of the company.

Design and development
The ArrowCopter was designed to comply with British BCAR Section T rules. It features a single main rotor, a two-seats in tandem configuration enclosed cockpit with a bubble canopy, stub wings, tricycle landing gear and a four-cylinder, liquid and air-cooled, four-stroke, dual-ignition turbocharged  Rotax 914 engine in pusher configuration. The  normally aspirated Rotax 912S and a  BMW boxer engine with a reduction drive were reported as being under consideration in 2011 as alternate powerplants.

The aircraft fuselage is made from an autoclave-cured carbon fibre/kevlar sandwich and mounts an  diameter rotor. The main landing gear wheels are mounted on the tips of the short wings.

The AC 10 flew for the first time on 20 November 2008 and the first production examples appeared in 2011. Production of the AC 20 began in 2012.  By 2015 at least 40 aircraft had been produced, going to customers in nine countries.

In September 2018, FD-Composites GmbH filed for insolvency protection due to management and financial issues. In October 2019 the Sichuan Dahua General Aircraft Manufacturing Company of China completed the purchase of ArrowCopter's assets. Sichuan Dahua indicated that they intended to retain manufacturing in Austria and set up parallel manufacturing in China.

Operational history
By January 2013 one example of the ArrowCopter AC10 had been registered in the United States with the Federal Aviation Administration.

Variants

FD-Composites ArrowCopter AC10
Initial version with a maximum takeoff mass of 
FD-Composites ArrowCopter AC20

Specifications (AC20)

References

External links

ArrowCopter website archives on Archive.org

2010s Austrian sport aircraft
Single-engined pusher autogyros
Aircraft first flown in 2008